The Pigeon Is the Most Popular Bird is the debut studio album of the noise rock band Six Finger Satellite, released in 1993 through Sub Pop.

Critical reception
The Seattle Times wrote that the band "create an intelligent (and radio-unfriendly) hybrid of conventional musical styles, sheer noise and structural deftness." Pitchfork called The Pigeon Is the Most Popular Bird "one of the best noise-rock records of the 90s," writing that "the transitions from silly to searing highlight SFS' unpredictable and caustic approach."

Track listing

Personnel

Six Finger Satellite
John MacLean – guitar, moog synthesizer, organ
Kurt Niemand – bass guitar
Richard D. Pelletier – drums
Peter Phillips – guitar, vocals
Jeremiah Ryan – vocals

Additional musicians and production
Laura Borealis (Laura Hyde Crapo)  – photography
John Golden – mastering
Marcellus Hall – harmonica (Tracks 10)
Robert Weston – engineering

References

1993 debut albums
Six Finger Satellite albums
Sub Pop albums